Bulletface is a 2010 American action thriller film directed by Albert Pyun. The screenplay was written by Randall Fontana, who had previously collaborated with Pyun on Hong Kong '97.

Synopsis 
Dara Maren is a DEA agent who gets dragged into the seedy underworld of California/Mexico border smuggling in an attempt to protect her younger brother. During a drug deal gone bad, she ends up shooting and killing an undercover ATF agent and is arrested. She's convicted and incarcerated inside a penal colony just outside Tijuana, where the prison officials harvest organs from the inmates. During her incarceration, Dara's brother is murdered by a drug lord who's also using human spinal fluid drained from his victims to create a new DNA-altering drug that turns those who become addicted to it into something not human. As hundreds of dead bodies start turning up along the Mexico border, and with law enforcement and government officials falling victim to its addictive properties as well, an old friend from the FBI manages to bribe the officials in Tijuana to let Dara back out onto the streets in order to bring down the drug lord and avenge her brother's murder.

Cast
 Victoria Maurette as Dara Marren
 Steven Bauer as Ned Walker
 Morgan Weisser as Josh Wexler
 Jenny Dare Paulin as Shannon Dall
 Eddie Velez as Eric Muller
 Scott Paulin as Brendon Wexler
 Francia Almendárez as Maria
 Michael Esparza as Bruno Maren
 Jeremy Parrish as Marco Muller / Robert Muller
 Assaf Cohen as Amir

Awards
2006 Northwest Independent Film Festival:

• Best Experimental Film

2012 Pollygrind Underground Film Festival

- Best Crime Film 

- Bad Girl Award

- Victoria Maurette 

- Best Sound Design

- Tony Riparetti

References

External links
 
 

2010 films
American independent films
2010s English-language films
2010 action thriller films
Films directed by Albert Pyun
American action thriller films
2010 independent films
2010s American films